Cristina Cavina (born 2 March 1969) is an Italian former professional tennis player.

Cavina is a native of Rome and trained at the Pirioli Tennis Club. She was a finalist in both the 14s and 16s age groups at the Italian national championships. On the professional tour she reached a best singles world ranking of 221 and was a main draw qualifier at the 1992 Italian Open.

Receiving a scholarship to Lynn University in 1992, Cavina earned NAIA All-American honors in each of her four seasons in collegiate tennis and amassed a 78–9 record in singles. She was named the NAIA Rookie of the Year in 1993 and NAIA Senior of the Year in 1996.

ITF finals

Doubles: 1 (0–1)

References

External links
 
 

1969 births
Living people
Italian female tennis players
Lynn Fighting Knights women's tennis players
Tennis players from Rome
20th-century Italian women